"One Night Without You" is a song written by Diane Warren for Australian singer Cosima's debut album, Cosima (2004). The song was released on 9 August 2004 as a double A-side with a cover of the Cold Chisel song "When the War Is Over".

The single reached number one on the Australian ARIA Singles Chart and remained there for two weeks. It was the fourth consecutive release by an Australian Idol finalist to debut at number one (after Guy Sebastian, Shannon Noll, and Paulini) and was certified Platinum in Australia for shipments of over 70,000 units.

Background 

"One Night Without You" was written by American songwriter, Diane Warren, as one of ten tracks for Australian singer, Cosima's debut album, Cosima (2004). The singer had competed in the first season of Australian Idol in late 2003 and finished in the top three. Cosima's first single, the double A-sided, "When the War Is Over" / "One Night Without You", was released on 9 August 2004. "When the War Is Over" is a cover version of Cold Chisel's ballad. It debuted at No. 1 on the ARIA Singles Chart. The single was certified platinum by ARIA for shipment of 70,000 units by December 2004.

Track listing
Australian CD single
 "When the War Is Over" – 3:47
 "One Night Without You" – 4:21
 "When the War Is Over" (acoustic version) – 3:45
 "One Night Without You" (extended mix) – 4:52

Charts

Weekly charts

Year-end charts

Certifications

References

2004 singles
2004 songs
Cosima De Vito songs
Number-one singles in Australia
Songs written by Diane Warren